The 1976–77 international cricket season was from September 1976 to April 1977.

Season overview

October

New Zealand in Pakistan

November

New Zealand in India

December

England in India

Pakistan in Australia

February

Australia in New Zealand

Pakistan in the West Indies

March

England in Australia

References

International cricket competitions by season
1977 in cricket
1978 in cricket